Dino Sani (born 23 May 1932) is a Brazilian former footballer and coach.  Sani was an experienced playmaking central midfielder with goalscoring prowess, and a "team player", who was well known for his ball skills, technique, accurate passing, creativity, and close control. Although he was not gifted with notable pace or athleticism, his positioning, keen tactical intelligence, outstanding vision, and his adeptness at long balls, in particular, made him a capable assist provider throughout his career.

Career
The son of Italian immigrants, Gaetano Sani and Maria Gabrielli, Sani started his career at local club Palmeiras, XV de Jaú, Comercial-SP and São Paulo FC, and played in the Argentine First Division for Boca Juniors in 1961, where he played 13 games, scoring 4 goals. He then played in Italy for Serie A club A.C. Milan, with whom he won one scudetto in the 1961–62 season, followed by the 1962–63 European Cup.

As a member of the Brazil national team, Dino Sani participated at the South American Championship tournaments of 1957 in Peru and 1959 in Argentina, reaching the final on both occasions; he was also part of the squad that won the 1958 World Cup in Sweden. He made 15 appearances in total for Brazil between 1957 and 1966, scoring 1 goal.

After he left Milan in 1964, he returned to South America, and played for Corinthians before becoming a coach. He managed Internacional, Goiás, Palmeiras, Coritiba, Peñarol, Flamengo, Fluminense, Boca Juniors, Qatar and Grêmio.

Honours

Club
Milan
Serie A (1): 1961–62
European Cup (1): 1962–63

International
Brazil
FIFA World Cup (1): 1958
Copa América Runner-up (2): 1957, 1959

Individual
A.C. Milan Hall of Fame
São Paulo FC Hall of Fame

References

External links

1932 births
Living people
Brazilian footballers
Expatriate footballers in Argentina
Expatriate footballers in Italy
Association football midfielders
Brazil international footballers
Brazilian expatriate footballers
1958 FIFA World Cup players
Campeonato Brasileiro Série A players
Argentine Primera División players
Serie A players
FIFA World Cup-winning players
Brazilian football managers
Expatriate football managers in Argentina
Expatriate football managers in Uruguay
Expatriate football managers in Qatar
Campeonato Brasileiro Série A managers
Brazilian people of Italian descent
Sociedade Esportiva Palmeiras players
Esporte Clube XV de Novembro (Jaú) players
Comercial Futebol Clube (Ribeirão Preto) players
São Paulo FC players
Boca Juniors footballers
A.C. Milan players
Sport Club Corinthians Paulista players
Sport Club Corinthians Paulista managers
Sport Club Internacional managers
Goiás Esporte Clube managers
Sociedade Esportiva Palmeiras managers
Coritiba Foot Ball Club managers
Peñarol managers
CR Flamengo managers
Fluminense FC managers
Associação Atlética Ponte Preta managers
Boca Juniors managers
Qatar national football team managers
Grêmio Foot-Ball Porto Alegrense managers
UEFA Champions League winning players
Brazilian expatriate sportspeople in Argentina
Brazilian expatriate sportspeople in Italy
Brazilian expatriate sportspeople in Qatar
Brazilian expatriate sportspeople in Uruguay
Footballers from São Paulo